Oh Yeong-hwan (February 10, 1988) is a Korean firefighter, essayist and politician. He first served as a military firefighter before being hired as a civilian firefighter in Seoul in 2010. There he worked at the Gwangjin Fire Station, the 119 Special Rescue Team, the Seongbuk Fire Station, and the National 119 Rescue Headquarters. After retiring from the fire service in 2019, he was named the 5th Democratic Party Recruitment Personnel in 2020.

Early life and education 
Born in Busan in 1988, he and his sister were born a father who was a lieutenant in the South Korean reserve army. After being discharged, his father experienced economic hardship, which put Oh's family into a difficult financial state before he had entered elementary school.

While attending high school, he came to idolize firefighters as heroes. He joined the Korea Disaster Prevention Engineering Co. Ltd., a fire prevention hardware company, installing and repairing fire-prevention fixtures such as induction lamps and detectors. 

While in the military, He worked under the Haeundae Beach 119 Marine Rescue Team and Haeundae Fire Station, Busan Fire Headquarters. In December 2015, he wrote an essay called A Firefighter's Prayer which tells the story of his experiences as a firefighter and his hopes for a better future.

Meeting novelist Kim Hoon 

Since high school, Oh had been a fan of novelist Kim Hoon's writing. Oh Yeong-hwan introduced himself to Kim at a lecture in 2013, and the two began correspondence. Oh sent Kim an essay; A Dream of an Auxiliary Firefighter, which tells the story of his childhood and military service as a firefighter. Kim later told Oh that his essay served as inspiration for his short story "Hands", published in the winter edition of Munhakdongne.

Career 
 Rescue team, Haeundae Fire Station, Busan Metropolitan City
 Rescuer, Gwangjin Fire Station, Seoul
 Dobongsan Mountain Rescue Team, 119 Special Rescue Team, Seoul
 Paramedics in Seongbuk Fire Station, Seoul
 Fire Department Rescue Team

Personal life 
He is married to Kim Ja-in, a professional rock climber.

Electoral history

References 

Living people
1988 births
South Korean firefighters
Members of the National Assembly (South Korea)